The Supersuckers are an American rock band, formed in 1988, whose music ranges from alternative rock to country rock to cowpunk. AllMusic describes the band as "the bastard sons of Foghat, AC/DC, and ZZ Top after being weaned on punk rock, unafraid of massive guitar riffs, outsized personalities, or pledging allegiance to sex, weed, and Satan with a wink and a nudge."

Bassist/singer Eddie Spaghetti (real name Edward Daly) leads the band and is its only constant member. Their current lineup also includes guitarist Marty Chandler and drummer Christopher von Streicher. Their most recent album, Play That Rock N' Roll, was released in February 2020.

History
The Supersuckers were formed in late 1988 as The Black Supersuckers in Tucson, Arizona, first playing traditional punk rock. The original line-up was Edward "Eddie Spaghetti" Daly on bass, Dan "Thunder" Bolton and Ron "Rontrose" Heathman on guitars, Dan Siegal (who later used the stage name Dancing Eagle) on drums, and Eric Martin on vocals. All had been high school friends in Tucson. In 1989, they moved to Seattle, Washington due to limited interest in their hometown scene. Martin then left the band, and Eddie Spaghetti took over on vocals. They recorded numerous singles and cover songs for various small labels before being signed to Sub Pop. Their early recordings are compiled on the 1992 release The Songs All Sound the Same. Their first album with Sub Pop, The Smoke of Hell, was released in 1992, featuring a cover by graphic artist Dan Clowes.

In 1995, guitarist Heathman temporarily left the band and was replaced by Rick Sims, formerly of the Didjits (and later the Gaza Strippers), for the recording of their third album, The Sacrilicious Sounds of the Supersuckers, which was produced by Paul Leary. Also in 1995, the Supersuckers played at Farm Aid for the first time. In 1997, Heathman returned for the recording of their fourth album, Must've Been High, which signaled a move into alternative country after the hard rock of the previous two albums. The album included a guest appearance by Willie Nelson, with whom the band had performed onstage at Farm Aid.

The band's final album with Sub-Pop was the compilation How the Supersuckers Became the Greatest Rock and Roll Band in the World in 1999. The band had left Sub Pop to sign a major-label deal with Interscope and announced a new traditional rock album, but they were dropped from the label during corporate restructuring and the planned album was never released. Some songs from the lost Interscope album appeared on the album The Evil Powers of Rock 'N' Roll in 1999, released on a small independent label. They contributed two songs, including one in collaboration with Eddie Vedder, to the charity album Free the West Memphis 3 in 2000. Disillusioned by the experience with Interscope, the band started their own label, Mid-Fi Recordings, in 2002.

Their first self-released album was Motherfuckers Be Trippin' in 2003. Drummer Dancing Eagle then left the band and was replaced by temporary drummers Mike "Murderburger" Musburger and Dusty Watson, followed by a six-year stint by Scott "Scottzilla" Churilla (who had previously played with Reverend Horton Heat). After several live albums and archival compilations released on their Mid-Fi label, Dancing Eagle returned to the lineup temporarily for their next full-length album, Get It Together, in 2008. The band then took an extended hiatus, during which Ron Heathman and Dancing Eagle left the band for the second time each and Eddie Spaghetti released two solo albums via Bloodshot Records. The band discontinued its Mid-Fi label and signed with Acetate Records, and Steamhammer Records in Europe, issuing the hard rock-oriented album Get the Hell in 2014. This album introduced new members "Metal" Marty Chandler on guitar and Christopher "Chango" von Streicher on drums.<ref>

American alternative country groups
American musical trios
Country music groups from Arizona
Bloodshot Records artists
Cowpunk musical groups
Garage punk groups
Indie rock musical groups from Arizona
Musical groups established in 1988
Musical groups from Tucson, Arizona
Punk rock groups from Arizona
Sub Pop artists